Palingenetic ultranationalism is a concept concerning generic fascism formulated by British political theorist Roger Griffin. The key element of the idea is the belief that fascism can be defined by its core myth, namely that of revolution to achieve a "national rebirth", palingenesis. Griffin argues that the unique synthesis of palingenesis and ultranationalism differentiates fascism from para-fascism and other authoritarian nationalist ideologies. He calls that the "fascist minimum" without which there is no fascism.

History
The idea was first put forth in the 1991 book The Nature of Fascism and was expanded in the paper "Staging the Nation's Rebirth: The Politics and Aesthetics of Performance in the Context of Fascist Studies" in the 1994 volume Fascism and Theatre: The Politics and Aesthetics in the Era of Fascism.

Roger Griffin argues that fascism uses the "palingenetic myth" to attract large masses of voters who have lost their faith in traditional politics and religion by promising them a brighter future under fascist rule. That promise is not made exclusively by fascists: other political ideologies also incorporate some palingenetic aspects in their party programs since politicians almost always promise to improve the situation. More radical movements often want to overthrow the old order, which has become decadent and alien to the common man. That powerful and energetic demolition of the old ways may require some form of revolution or battle, which is, however, represented as glorious and necessary. Such movements thus compare the (recent) past with the future, which is presented as a rebirth of society after a period of decay and misery. The palingenetic myth can also possibly stand for a return to a golden age in the country's history so that the past can be a guidebook to a better tomorrow, with an associated regime that superficially resembles a reactionary one. Fascism distinguishes itself by being the only ideology that focuses strongly on the revolution in its myth or, as Griffin puts it:

 
Through all of that, there will be one great leader who battles the representatives of the old system with grassroots support. It appears as one mass of people with only one goal: to create their new future. They have infinite faith in their mythical hero as he stands for everything they believe in. With him, the country will rise like a phoenix from the ashes of corruption and decadence.

Contemporary examples
National-anarchism has been argued to be a syncretic political ideology that was developed in the 1990s by former Third Positionists to promote a "stateless palingenetic ultranationalism".

See also
 Eternal return (Eliade)
 Reactionary modernism

References

External links
 "Modernity, Modernism, and Fascism: A 'Mazeway Resynthesis'"
 "Staging the Nation's Rebirth" (PDF)

Anthropology
Fascism
Nationalism
Political theories